Lactonifactor is a Gram-positive and anaerobic bacterial genus from the family of Clostridiaceae with one known species (Lactonifactor longoviformis). Lactonifactor longoviformis has been isolated from the human feces.

References

Clostridiaceae
Bacteria genera
Monotypic bacteria genera
Taxa described in 2007